Zeeland (historical English exonym Zealand) is the westernmost and least populous province of the Netherlands. The province, located in the southwest of the country, borders North Brabant to the east, South Holland to the north, as well as the country of Belgium to the south and west. It consists of a number of islands and peninsulas (hence its name, meaning "Sealand") and a strip bordering the Flemish provinces of East and West Flanders. Its capital is Middelburg with a population of 48,544 as of November 2019, although the largest municipality in Zeeland is Terneuzen (population 54,589). Zeeland has two seaports: Vlissingen and Terneuzen.

Large parts of Zeeland are below sea level. The last great flooding of the area was in 1953. Tourism is an important economic activity. In the summer, its beaches make it a popular destination for tourists, especially German tourists. In some areas, the population can be two to four times higher during the high summer season. The coat of arms of Zeeland shows a lion half-emerged from water, and the text  (Latin for "I struggle and emerge"). The country of New Zealand was named after Zeeland after it was sighted by Dutch explorer Abel Tasman.

History 

Nehalennia is a mythological goddess of an ancient religion known around the province of Zeeland. Her worship dates back at least to the 2nd century BC, and flourished in the 2nd and 3rd centuries AD. She was possibly a regional god, either Celtic or pre-Germanic – but sources differ on the culture that first worshipped her. During the Roman era, her main function appeared to be the protection of travelers, especially seagoing travelers crossing the North Sea. Most of what is known about her mythology comes from the remains of carved stone offerings (votives) which have been dredged up from the Oosterschelde (Eastern Scheldt) since 1870. Two more Nehalennia offering stones have also been found in Cologne, Germany.

Zeeland was a contested area between the counts of Holland and Flanders until 1299, when the last count of Holland died. The Counts of Hainaut then gained control of the County of Zeeland, followed by the counts of Bavaria, Burgundy, and Habsburg. After 1585, Zeeland followed, as one of the 7 independent provinces, the fate of the Northern part of The Netherlands.

In 1432 it became part of the Low Countries possessions of Philip the Good of Burgundy, the later Seventeen Provinces. Through marriage, the Seventeen Provinces became the property of the Habsburgs in 1477. In the Eighty Years' War, Zeeland was on the side of the Union of Utrecht, and became one of the United Provinces. The area now called  (or Zeelandic Flanders) was not part of Zeeland, but a part of the county of Flanders (still under Habsburg control) that was conquered by the United Provinces, hence called  (see: Generality Lands).

After the French occupation (see  Bouches-de-l'Escaut) and the formation of the United Kingdom of the Netherlands in 1815, the present province Zeeland was formed.

During World War II, Zeeland was occupied by Nazi Germany between June 1940 and November 1944. In 1944, Zeeland was devastated by the Battle of the Scheldt and the Walcheren Landings, which brought about the Inundation of Walcheren,  between British and Canadian forces, and the occupying Germans.

The catastrophic North Sea flood of 1953, which killed over 1800 people in Zeeland, led to the construction of the protective Delta Works.

Geography 

The province of Zeeland is a large river delta situated at the mouth of several major rivers, namely Scheldt ('Schelde'), Rhine ('Rijn') and Meuse ('Maas'). Most of the province lies below sea level and was reclaimed from the sea by inhabitants over time. What used to be a muddy landscape, flooding at high tide and reappearing at low tide, became a series of small man-made hills that stayed dry at all times. The people of the province would later connect the hills by creating dikes, which led to a chain of dry land that later grew into bigger islands and gave the province its current shape. The shape of the islands has changed over time at the hands of both people and nature.

The North Sea flood of 1953 inundated vast amounts of land that were only partially reclaimed. The subsequent construction of the Delta Works also changed the face of the province. The infrastructure, although very distinct by the number of bridges, tunnels and dams, has not shaped the geography of the province so much as the geography of the province has shaped its infrastructure. The dams, tunnels and bridges that are currently a vital part of the province's road system were constructed over the span of decades and came to replace old ferry lines. The final touch to this process came in 2003 when the Western Scheldt Tunnel was opened. It was the first solid connection between both banks of the Western Scheldt and ended the era of water separating the islands and peninsulas of Zeeland.

Zeeland consists of several islands and peninsulas. These are, from north to south, Schouwen-Duiveland, Tholen, Noord-Beveland, Walcheren and Zuid-Beveland. It also includes a strip of land bordering the Belgian region of Flanders, the Zeelandic Flanders.

Municipalities 
The province of Zeeland has 13 municipalities:

The largest cities are: Middelburg with 42,000 inhabitants; Vlissingen with 34,000; Goes with 28,000; and Terneuzen with 25,000.

Demographics 

It is the least populous and the 2nd least densely populated province of the Netherlands.

Religion 

Zeeland is mainly a Protestant region; Calvinism is dominant. The Dutch Bible Belt begins in Zeeland.

There are also adherents of the Roman Catholic Church. After being long part of the vast Franco-Flemish Roman Catholic Diocese of Cambrai, Zeeland got its own bishopric, the Diocese of Middelburg, on 5 December 1559, which was suppressed in 1603, its territory being merged into the Apostolic Vicariate of Batavia, only to be 'restored' on March 22, 1803, as the Apostolic Vicariate of Breda, which was promoted to the present large (yet counting few faithful) Diocese of Breda, whose See is in the other part, western North Brabant, and enlarged further in 1955, gaining territory from the Roman Catholic Diocese of Haarlem-Amsterdam.

Politics

Provincial council 
The States-Provincial (Provinciale Staten) of Zeeland are the provincial council, called the States of Zeeland.

Provincial executive 
The Provincial-Executive (Gedeputeerde Staten) of Zeeland and the King's Commissioner (Commissaris van de Koning) of Zeeland are the provincial executive.

Han Polman, member of D66, has been the King's Commissioner of Zeeland since 2013.

As of the 2007 provincial election a coalition consisted of CDA, SGP, ChristianUnion and GreenLeft, with 20 of 39 seats.

As of the 2011 provincial election a coalition consisted of VVD, PvdA, CDA and SGP, with 24 of 39 seats.

As of the 2015 provincial election a coalition consisted of CDA, VVD, SGP and PvdA, with 22 of 39 seats.

As of the 2019 provincial election the same coalition consists of CDA, VVD, SGP and PvdA, with 20 of 39 seats.

Economy 
The Gross domestic product (GDP) of the region was 13.6 billion € in 2018, accounting for 1.8% of the Netherlands economic output. GDP per capita adjusted for purchasing power was 30,900 € or 102% of the EU27 average in the same year.

Transportation

Train 
There is one passenger railway line, running from Flushing to Roosendaal, serving the following stations in Zeeland:

Vlissingen (IC)

Vlissingen-Souburg

Middelburg (IC)

Arnemuiden

Goes (IC)

Kapelle-Biezelinge

Kruiningen-Yerseke

Krabbendijke

Rilland-Bath

Alle stations are served twice per hour, stations marked with (IC) are also served by additional IC services in the peak hour.

Bus 
Bus lines include:
 Line 20: Goes - Terneuzen - Hulst (passing through the Westerschelde Tunnel)
Line 50: Middelburg - Terneuzen (passing through the Westerschelde tunnel)
Line 104: Renesse – Brouwersdam – Ouddorp – Spijkenisse
Line 133: Middelburg – Vrouwenpolder – Oosterscheldedam – Renesse – Zierikzee – Grevelingendam – Oude-Tonge (crossing the Oosterscheldekering)
 Line 395: Zierikzee – Bruinisse – Rotterdam-Zuidplein

Media 

Provinciale Zeeuwse Courant and BN/De Stem are the regional daily newspapers in the province.

Namesakes
The first westerners to sight New Zealand were captained by Dutch navigator Abel Tasman in 1642, although he did not land there. Tasman named it Staten Landt, believing it to be part of the land of that name off the coast of Argentina that is now known as Isla de los Estados. When that was shown not to be so, Dutch authorities named it Nova Zeelandia in Latin, Nieuw Zeeland in Dutch. The two major seafaring provinces of the Netherlands in its Golden Age were Holland and Zeeland, and the Dutch explorers originally named the largest landmass of Oceania and the two islands to the southeast Nieuw Holland and Nieuw Zeeland, respectively. The former was eventually replaced by the name Australia, but the name New Zealand remained in place for the latter. Captain James Cook of Britain later anglicised the name to New Zealand and, after British settlers arrived in New Zealand, English became the main language.

The city of Zeeland in the US state of Michigan was settled in 1847 by Dutchman Jannes van de Luyster and was incorporated in 1907. Flushing, a neighborhood within the borough of Queens, New York, is named after the city Flushing (Vlissingen in Dutch) in Zeeland. This dates from the period of the colony of New Netherland, when New York was still known as New Amsterdam. The Dutch colonies of Nieuw Walcheren and Nieuw Vlissingen, both on the Antillian island of Tobago, were both named after parts of Zeeland. The Canadian town of Zealand, New Brunswick, was named for the Zeeland birthplace of Dutchman Philip Crouse who settled in the area in 1789.
Zeeland, North Dakota is another town named for this province and whose earliest settlers were of Dutch heritage.

Paramaribo, the capital and largest city of Suriname, has a Fort Zeelandia, the former Fort Willoughby during British colonization.

Fort Zeelandia was a fortress built over ten years from 1624 to 1634 by the Dutch East India Company, in the town of Anping (Tainan) on the island of Formosa, present day Taiwan, during their 38-year rule over the western part of it.

References

External links 

 
 Zeeland Tourist Board
 
 GCatholic - Breda diocese

 
NUTS 2 statistical regions of the European Union
Provinces of the Netherlands